The 156th Boat Race took place on 3 April 2010.  Held annually, the event is a side-by-side rowing race between crews from the Universities of Oxford and Cambridge along the River Thames. The race was won by Cambridge.  Of the eighteen competitors in the race, six were British. Of the non-British rowers, the Oxford crew featured the American Olympic finalists, the Winklevoss twins.  It was the first time the race had a title sponsor; it was also known as the "Xchanging Boat Race", having been sponsored by Xchanging.

Oxford won the Women's Boat Race by four lengths while Cambridge's Goldie beat Oxford's Isis in the reserve race.

Background
The Boat Race is a side-by-side rowing competition between the University of Oxford (sometimes referred to as the "Dark Blues") and the University of Cambridge (sometimes referred to as the "Light Blues").  First held in 1829, the race takes place on the  Championship Course on the River Thames in southwest London.  The rivalry is a major point of honour between the two universities and followed throughout the United Kingdom and broadcast worldwide. Oxford went into the race as reigning champions, having won the 2009 race by  lengths, while Cambridge led overall with 79 victories to Oxford's 75 (excluding the "dead heat" of 1877). The race was sponsored by Xchanging for the sixth consecutive year, but it was the first time in the 180-year history of the Boat Race that the title had been given over to sponsorship; as such it was referred to as the "Xchanging Boat Race".

Prior to the race, Oxford University Boat Club president and Dutch international rower Sjoerd Hamburger claimed "Last year we had an exceptional crew, power-wise, which we don't have this year, but we're starting to match the times we did last year, so I'm very pleased". His Cambridge counterpart, American Deaglan McEachern, responded: "we're faster". Umpire and former Cambridge Blue Simon Harris suggested that he did not anticipate any problems with the two coxes obeying his instructions: "I've been impressed by the coxes, how they've responded to the umpire's calls".

The first Women's Boat Race took place in 1927, but did not become an annual fixture until the 1960s. Up until 2014, the contest was conducted as part of the Henley Boat Races, but as of the 2015 race, it is held on the River Thames, on the same day as the men's main and reserve races.  The reserve race, contested between Oxford's Isis boat and Cambridge's Goldie boat has been held since 1965.  It usually takes place on the Tideway, prior to the main Boat Race.

Crews
The Dark Blues were coached by Sean Bowden for the 13th time while the Light Blues saw Chris Nilsson act as chief coach for the second time. Cambridge's crew featured four Britons, three Americans and two Canadians, while Oxford's consisted of three Americans, two Britons, and rowers from Ireland, The Netherlands, Canada (dual nationality) and Germany.

Oxford's crew included the Winklevoss twins (Cameron and Tyler), who rowed in the 2008 Olympic Games for the United States in the men's coxless pair. Cambridge's bowman, Canadian international rower Robert Weitemeyer, had won the gold in the men's eight at the World Rowing Cup in 2007.

Race

Oxford were pre-race favourites, and won the toss, electing to start the race from the Surrey station. They took an early lead and were nearly half a length up on Cambridge by the time the crews passed the Harrods Furniture Depository. The boats closed in on one another and umpire Harris was forced to issue a number of warnings to both coxes as the crews came close to clashing oars. The Light Blues pulled themselves back into contention around the Chiswick Reach and took the lead into Corney Reach. Oxford attempted to find a quicker racing line and were still in touch, but Cambridge inched away from them, passing the finishing post  lengths ahead in a time of 17 minutes 35 seconds.

Oxford won the 65th Women's Boat Race by four lengths, their third consecutive victory.  Oxford's Isis beat Cambridge's Goldie in the reserve race by two lengths, their first win in three years.

Reaction

Cambridge cox Randolph exclaimed "The whole way through I was thinking: 'We could win it, we could win it, we could win it". Race umpire Simon Harris declared "it was a fantastic race".  Olympic medallist Steve Redgrave remarked "All credit to Oxford ...  but all the way from the bend on there was only going to be one winner. It just took Cambridge a little while before they believed it was going to happen."

References

External links

 Official website

The Boat Race
2010 in English sport
2010 in rowing
2010 sports events in London
April 2010 sports events in the United Kingdom